Goat Island is a small island in Narragansett Bay and is part of the city of Newport, Rhode Island, U.S. The island is connected to the Easton's Point neighborhood via a causeway bridge. It is home to the Newport Harbor Light (1842), residences, a restaurant, event space, and hotel.

Colonial History

Narragansett Indians called the island "Nante Sinunk" and sold it in 1658. Early Newport colonists used the island as a goat pasture. The island's name has also been attributed to early colonists' discovery of a breed of goats nicknamed the New American Goat. An earthen fort was built on Goat Island in 1703 during the War of Spanish Succession, and it was named "Fort Anne" after the reigning Queen Anne.

On Friday, 19 July 1723, twenty-six pirates were buried on the north end of Goat Island, on the shore, between high and low water mark. The significance of this placement is that, to Christians of this era, this inter-tidal land was considered "unhallowed ground," like burials placed outside of a consecrated cemetery. The men had been tried in Newport between 10 and 12 July and hanged at nearby Bull's Point (Gravelly Point). They were: Charles Harris, Thomas Linicar, Daniel Hyde, Stephen Mundon, Abraham Lacy, Edward Lawson, John Tomkins, Francis Laughton, John Fisgerald, William Studfield, Owen Rice, William Read, John Bright, Thomas Hazel, William Blades (Rhode Island), Thomas Hagget, Peter Cues, William Jones, Edward Eaton, John Brown, James Sprinkly, Joseph Sound, Charles Church, John Waters, Thomas Powell (Connecticut), and Joseph Libbey. "The pirates were all young men, most of them natives of England." The following is taken from The Salem Observer, November 11, 1843: "...this was the most extensive execution of pirates that ever took place at one time in the Colonies, it was attended by a vast multitude from every part of New England."

In 1738, a stone fort was built and renamed Fort George after King George II. In 1769, Rhode Islanders burned the customs ship  when it drifted to the north end of Goat Island (near where the pirates were buried) in another early act of rebellion against British rule.

In September 2018 maritime archaeologists reported that they had discovered the resting place of Captain Cook's HMS Endeavour just off the coast of Goat Island, where it had been used to blockade the British during the American Revolutionary War. The ship and its crew had been made famous as the first European explorers to visit Australia's east coast.

Revolutionary War

In 1775, the Fort was renamed Fort Liberty.  The British army occupied Newport from 1776 through 1779 and renamed it Fort George during that time.

Post-revolution

In 1784 the fort on Goat Island was repaired and renamed Fort Washington after George Washington.  In 1794, Newport sold Goat Island to the federal government for $1,500 to maintain a military fort to defend Newport Harbor. The fort was named Fort Wolcott in commemoration the services of Oliver Wolcott who was a General of the Militia and a member of the Continental Congress from Connecticut.  In 1824, the first Newport Harbor Lighthouse was constructed at the north end of the island.  Fort Wolcott was active until 1835 when the garrison was transferred to Florida to fight the Seminole Indians.

In 1851 the original lighthouse moved to Prudence Island to become Prudence Island Light, and the current Newport Harbor Light was constructed on a dike near the former lighthouse site.  The area surrounding the dike was later filled in when the hotel was constructed much later.

Naval Torpedo Station

In 1869 the U.S. Naval Torpedo Station was founded on Goat Island, on the site of the former Army fort.  The Station was greatly expanded over the next 100 years and produced many of the Navy's torpedoes through World War I and World War II at the island's Navy Torpedo Factory.  One of the Navy's first radio stations was established on the island in 1903.  The torpedo station was closed in 1951 and Naval Undersea Warfare Center was created with a facility nearby.

Coast Guard
In addition to the Goat Island lighthouse, the Coast Guard has maintained a cutter at Goat Island since at least the late 1960s.  The Point-class cutter  served her entire 31-year career at Goat Island from when she was commissioned on 14 April 1967 until she was decommissioned on 3 April 1998. The tradition of having a Coast Guard cutter stationed at Goat Island resumed when the Marine Protector-class coastal patrol boat  was commissioned on 16 July 2005.

Redevelopment
In the 1960s, Goat Island was sold to a private developer, Globe Manufacturing. Over the next several decades, Globe constructed the Colonial Hilton Hotel (later known as the Sheraton Islander Inn, Islander Doubletree Hotel, the Hyatt Regency, and, as of late, Gurney's Newport) and Goat Island South Condominiums, and converted the only former navy building remaining on the island into the Goat Island Marina and Marina Bar & Grille. In the 1990s Island Development Corp. (IDC) constructed the "Regatta Club", an event venue.  After two Rhode Island Supreme Court decisions regarding the development, Goat Island South Condominiums took possession of the Regatta Club, leasing it to a third party. In 2006, Longwood Venues and Destinations opened Belle Mer, an event space for private functions, spanning 7.5 acres.

See also

References

External links

 Prologue: July 19, 1723 from gregflemming.com
 Goat Island South Know the Facts
 

Islands of Newport County, Rhode Island
Islands of Narragansett Bay
Buildings and structures in Newport, Rhode Island
Colonial forts in Rhode Island
Installations of the United States Army
Forts in Rhode Island
Islands of Rhode Island